Barrie Bennett (born 6 February 1955) is an English cricketer. He played two first-class matches for Cambridge University Cricket Club in 1979.

See also
 List of Cambridge University Cricket Club players

References

External links
 

1955 births
Living people
English cricketers
Cambridge University cricketers
People from Ismailia Governorate